is a Japanese video game designer, director, and producer. He works for Nintendo as the project manager of their The Legend of Zelda series. Aonuma is also one of the deputy general managers of Nintendo's Entertainment Planning & Development division, having served that role since 2019. Currently, Aonuma is working on a sequel to 2017's game The Legend of Zelda: Breath of the Wild, called The Legend of Zelda: Tears of the Kingdom, scheduled for release in May 2023.

Career
Aonuma graduated from the Tokyo University of the Arts in 1988 with a masters degree in composition design, working on marionettes. After graduating, he was interviewed at Nintendo. Aonuma met Shigeru Miyamoto during the interview, and showed Miyamoto samples of his college work. He landed a job at Nintendo without ever having played a video game before. He asked his girlfriend about video games, and she introduced him to two Yuji Horii games, Dragon Quest (1986) on the Famicom and The Portopia Serial Murder Case (1983) on the PC-8801, which were the first video games he ever played. 

His first projects involved graphic design, creating sprites for Nintendo Entertainment System games such as 1991's NES Open Tournament Golf. Aonuma was director of development on 1996's Marvelous: Mōhitotsu no Takarajima for the Super Nintendo Entertainment System. In a move which Aonuma attributes to his position on the Marvelous team, Miyamoto recruited Aonuma to join the development team for the Zelda series. He spent several years as a lead designer of The Legend of Zelda series: The Legend of Zelda: Ocarina of Time and its sequel Majora's Mask, both for the Nintendo 64; and The Wind Waker, the first Zelda game for the GameCube. After The Wind Waker, he considered moving on to other projects, but was convinced by Shigeru Miyamoto to continue with the Zelda series.

Aonuma then led the production of The Legend of Zelda: Twilight Princess, the second major Zelda game to be released for the GameCube and a launch game for the Wii. He then produced a sequel to The Wind Waker for the Nintendo DS, The Legend of Zelda: Phantom Hourglass, followed by another Nintendo DS title, The Legend of Zelda: Spirit Tracks. He also produced Link's Crossbow Training and The Legend of Zelda: Skyward Sword for the Wii, The Legend of Zelda: A Link Between Worlds for the Nintendo 3DS, and The Legend of Zelda: Breath of the Wild for the Nintendo Switch and Wii U. In November 2016, Aonuma received the Lifetime Achievement Award at the Golden Joystick Awards. 

In addition to producing Zelda games, Aonuma plays percussion as a member of a brass band he founded with five others in 1995, known as The Wind Wakers, named after the game of the same name. The band comprises over 70 Nintendo employees who perform four concerts a year. In June 2019, he was promoted to the position of deputy general manager within the company's Entertainment Planning & Development division.

Works

References

External links

 
 

1963 births
Japanese video game designers
Living people
Nintendo people
People from Nagano (city)
Tokyo University of the Arts alumni
The Legend of Zelda
Japanese video game producers
Japanese video game directors
Japanese video game businesspeople